Thomas Larsson (born 20 January 1955) is a Swedish former football player.

During his club career, Sandberg played for Örgryte IS, OGC Nice and Skövde AIK.

Larsson made 10 appearances for the Sweden national football team between 1981 and 1982, scoring 6 goals.

External links

1955 births
Swedish footballers
Sweden international footballers
Örgryte IS players
OGC Nice players
Skövde AIK players
Association football forwards
Living people
Sportspeople from Norrköping
Footballers from Östergötland County